The diffuson is a mathematical object, which often appears in the theory of disordered electronic systems (a part of condensed matter physics). 

In a disordered system, the motion of an electron is not ballistic, but diffusive: i.e., the electron does not move along a straight line, but experiences a series of random scatterings off of impurities. This random motion (diffusion) is described by a differential equation, known as the diffusion equation. The diffuson is the Green's function of the diffusion equation.

The diffuson plays an important role in the theory of electron transport in disordered systems, especially for phase coherent effects such as universal conductance fluctuations.

Diffusion
Mesoscopic physics